Frédéric Gros (born 30 November 1965) is a French philosopher. He is a specialist in the work of Michel Foucault.

Awards and honors 
 2007 Prix Bordin of the Académie des sciences morales et politiques
 Prix du livre incorrect 2018
 Prix lycéen du livre de philosophie 2019

Publications 
 
 
 
 (dir.), Foucault. Le courage de la vérité, Presses universitaires de France, coll. « Débats philosophiques », Paris, 2002, 168 p.

References

1965 births
Living people
French philosophers